The 2017–18 Northern State Wolves men's basketball team represents Northern State University in the 2017-18 NCAA Division II men's basketball season. The Wolves were led by eighth year head coach Paul Sather and played their home games at Wachs Arena in Aberdeen, South Dakota. They competed as members of the Northern Sun Intercollegiate Conference. After winning the NSIC tournament, the Wolves received an automatic bid into the 2018 NCAA Division II men's basketball tournament. They were berthed with the #2 seed in the regional tournament and beat Minnesota State by a score of 90–83 to win the Central Region Tournament and move on to the Elite Eight. The Elite Eight was held in Sioux Falls, South Dakota. The Wolves beat East Stroudsburg and Queens to move on the National Championship game where they lost to the Ferris State Bulldogs by a score of 69–71.

Previous season
During the previous season, the Wolves finished with a record of 22–8 (17–5 NSIC) and tied for second in the conference.

Roster

Schedule and results

|-
!colspan=12 style=| Non-conference regular season

|-
!colspan=12 style=| NSIC regular season

|-
!colspan=12 style=| Non-conference regular season

|-
!colspan=12 style=| NSIC regular season

|-
!colspan=12 style=| NSIC Tournament

|-
!colspan=12 style=| NCAA Central Regional

|-
!colspan=12 style=| Elite Eight

|-

References

Northern State Wolves men's basketball seasons
Northern State
Northern State Wolves
Northern State Wolves